Luzhanka is a land border crossing between Ukraine and Hungary on the Ukrainian side, near the village of Astei, Berehove Raion, Zakarpattia Oblast.

The crossing is situated on autoroute . Across the border on the Hungarian side is Beregshuran checkpoint on the Szabolcs-Szatmár-Bereg County border and main road 41 in the direction of Nyíregyháza.

The Luzhanka checkpoint, in addition to radiological, customs and border control, may carry out phytosanitary, veterinary, environmental and control of the International Road Transport Service. It is part of the Vynohradiv customs post at the Chop dustoms. The code of the checkpoint is 30507 16 00 (11).

See also
 Hungary–Ukraine border
 State Border of Ukraine
 Highway M24 (Ukraine)

References

Geography of Zakarpattia Oblast
Hungary–Ukraine border crossings